This is a list of people legally executed in Mexico. The death penalty was a legal punishment in Mexico since Pre-Columbian times, and was still applied during its contemporary history. The last non-military execution in Mexico was in 1937, and the last military execution was in 1961, with the civil death penalty being abolished in 1976 and the military death penalty in 2005. The next list is representative and includes people condemned and executed during Mexican history:

Twentieth century

Civilian (until 1937)

Military (until 1961)

Extrajudicial killings

Victims of anti-Catholic violence in Mexico

Commuted death sentences

References

Lists of executed people
People executed by Mexico
Prisoners sentenced to death by Mexico
Prisoners who died in Mexican detention